The men's shot put competition at the 1968 Summer Olympics in Mexico City, Mexico took place on October 13–14. Nineteen athletes from 14 nations competed. The maximum number of athletes per nation had been set at 3 since the 1930 Olympic Congress. The event was wo by Randy Matson of the United States, the nation's sixth consecutive and 14th overall victory in the men's shot put. His teammate George Woods took silver, making 1968 the sixth straight Games the Americans had finished one-two. Matson was the seventh man to win two medals in the event (adding to his 1964 silver); Woods would become the eighth in 1972. Eduard Gushchin took bronze, the Soviet Union's first men's shot put medal.

Background

This was the 16th appearance of the event, which is one of 12 athletics events to have been held at every Summer Olympics. Returning finalists from the 1964 Games were silver medalist Randy Matson of the United States, bronze medalist Vilmos Varju of Hungary, seventh-place finisher Les Mills of New Zealand, ninth-place finisher Władysław Komar of Poland, and twelfth-place finisher Dieter Hoffmann of the United Team of Germany (now competing for East Germany). Matson had been the best shot putter in the world since the 1964 Games, breaking the world record twice.

El Salvador and Nicaragua each made their debut in the men's shot put; East Germany and West Germany competed separately for the first time. The United States appeared for the 16th time, the only nation to have competed in all Olympic shot put competitions to date.

Competition format

The competition consisted of two rounds, qualification and final. Each athlete received three throws in the qualifying round. All who achieved the qualifying distance of 18.90 metres progressed to the final. If fewer than twelve athletes achieved this mark, then the twelve furthest throwing athletes reached the final. Each finalist was allowed three throws in last round, with the top eight athletes after that point being given three further attempts.

Records

Prior to the competition, the existing world and Olympic records were as follows.

Randy Matson broke the Olympic record with a throw of 20.68 metres in the qualifying round. Nobody, including Matson, was able to surpass that mark in the final.

Schedule

All times are Central Standard Time (UTC-6)

Results

Qualifying round

Qual. rule: qualification standard 18.90m (Q) or at least best 12 qualified (q).

Final

References

External links
 Official Olympic Report, la84foundation.org. Retrieved August 13, 2012.

Athletics at the 1968 Summer Olympics
Shot put at the Olympics
Men's events at the 1968 Summer Olympics